The 1898–99 WPHL season was the second season of operation for the Western Pennsylvania Hockey League. Four Pittsburgh-area teams competed in the season, in which all games were played at the Duquesne Gardens. The league reconstituted in the newly finished hockey rink at the Duquesne Gardens, after the Schenley Park Casino was destroyed in an 1896 fire that cut short the previous WPHL season. The old venue's in-house, Pittsburgh Casino team, was not reformed and only three teams played in the league.

The Pittsburgh Athletic Club won 9 of 12 games to win their first WPHL championship.

Final standings

References
 

Western Pennsylvania Hockey League seasons
WPHL